Hannah Hoes Van Buren (born Hoes; March 8, 1783 – February 5, 1819) was the wife of the eighth President of the United States, Martin Van Buren. She died from tuberculosis in 1819, before Martin Van Buren became President. He never remarried and was one of the few Presidents to be unmarried while in office.

During Martin Van Buren's term, his daughter-in-law Angelica acted as hostess of the White House and First Lady of the United States.

Other websites
Biography of Hannah Hoes Van Buren  at whitehouse.gov
Hannah Van Buren at C-SPAN's First Ladies: Influence & Image

1783 births
1819 deaths
Deaths from tuberculosis
Martin Van Buren
People from New York (state)